New York State Route 154 (NY 154) was a state highway in Rensselaer County, New York, in the United States. It began at an intersection with U.S. Route 4 (US 4) in the city of Troy and ended at then-County Route 77 (CR 77, now NY 351) in the hamlet of Poestenkill. Along the way, it intersected NY 66 and NY 355. The route was assigned in the early 1930s and eliminated in 1980 as part of a highway maintenance swap between the state of New York and Rensselaer County. The portion of the highway between the Troy city line and NY 355 became County Route 130 while the part connecting NY 355 to Poestenkill became an extension of NY 355.

Route description

NY 154 began at the intersection of US 4 (Vandenburgh Avenue) and Campbell Avenue in southern Troy. The route headed to the northeast, running alongside Wynants Kill as it followed Campbell Avenue through the residential southern portion of Troy. The route and the river crossed paths after , with Wynants Kill proceeding southeastward toward the hamlet of Wynantskill and NY 154 continuing northeastward to a junction with Spring Avenue, a street linking NY 154 to the downtown district. Campbell Avenue ended here; however, the route continued on, following Spring Avenue east for three blocks to an intersection with NY 66 (Pawling Avenue) just south of the Emma Willard School.

Past NY 66, NY 154 traversed several additional city blocks before leaving Troy and entering the town of Brunswick. This section of the route passed through a mostly rural portion of Rensselaer County as it gradually headed southeastward toward an intersection with NY 355. Until 1980, NY 355 ended here while NY 154 continued into the hamlet of Poestenkill along Main Street. NY 154 passed north of the Rensselaer County Airpark west of the hamlet before coming to an end in the center of the community at a junction with CR 77 (now NY 351).

History
NY 154 was assigned  to an alignment extending from NY 66 to the hamlet of Poestenkill by way of Spring Avenue and Main Street. It was extended southwestward along Spring and Campbell Avenues to a new terminus at US 4 in the late 1970s, but was eliminated on May 14, 1980, as a result of a highway maintenance swap between the state of New York and Rensselaer County that took effect on April 1 of that year. As part of the swap, the portion of NY 154 between the Troy city limits and NY 355 was transferred from the state to the county and redesignated as CR 130. The remaining state-maintained portion of NY 154 from NY 355 to Poestenkill became an extension of NY 355; however, the segment still bears reference markers for NY 154. Within Troy, the route was maintained by the city.

Major intersections

See also

List of county routes in Rensselaer County, New York

References

External links

NY State Route 355 Ends (includes former eastern terminus of NY 154)

154
Transportation in Rensselaer County, New York